"Fly (The Angel Song)" is a song written by Steve Wilkinson and Rory Bourke, and recorded by Canadian country music group The Wilkinsons. It was released in October 1998 as the second single from their album Nothing but Love. It reached #1 on the Canadian RPM Country Tracks chart in January 1999 and #15 on the U.S. Billboard Hot Country Singles & Tracks chart.

Music video
The music video was directed by Deaton Flanigen and premiered in late 1998.

Chart performance

Year-end charts

References

1998 singles
1998 songs
The Wilkinsons songs
Songs written by Rory Bourke
Song recordings produced by Doug Johnson (record producer)
Music videos directed by Deaton-Flanigen Productions
Giant Records (Warner) singles